United Nations Security Council Resolution 358, adopted unanimously on 15 August 1974, deeply concerned about the continuing violence and bloodshed in Cyprus and deploring the non-compliance with resolution 357, the Council recalled its previous resolutions on the matter and insisted on their full implementation and that all parties immediately and strictly observe the cease-fire.

See also
 Cyprus dispute
 List of United Nations Security Council Resolutions 301 to 400 (1971–1976)
 Turkish invasion of Cyprus

References
Text of the Resolution at undocs.org

External links
 

 0358
 0358
Turkish invasion of Cyprus
 0358
August 1974 events